Brachygalaxias is a genus of osmeriform fish of the family Galaxiidae with two species endemic to Chile:
 Brachygalaxias bullocki (Regan, 1908)
 Brachygalaxias gothei Busse, 1982

References

 
Fish of South America
Freshwater fish genera
Taxa named by Carl H. Eigenmann
Endemic fauna of Chile